Mahatao, officially the Municipality of Mahatao, is a 6th class municipality in the province of Batanes, Philippines. According to the 2020 census, it has a population of 1,703 people.

History

Geography

According to the Philippine Statistics Authority, the municipality has a land area of  constituting  of the  total area of Batanes.

Barangays
Mahatao is politically subdivided into 4 barangays. These barangays are headed by elected officials: Barangay Captain, Barangay Council, whose members are called Barangay Councilors. All are elected every three years.

Hanib was corrected into Hañib by the Philippine Statistics Authority.

Climate

Demographics

In the 2020 census, Mahatao had a population of 1,703.

Economy

Government
Mahatao, belonging to the lone congressional district of the province of Batanes, is governed by a mayor designated as its local chief executive and by a municipal council as its legislative body in accordance with the Local Government Code. The mayor, vice mayor, and the councilors are elected directly by the people through an election which is being held every three years.

Elected officials

Education
The Schools Division of Batanes governs the town's public education system. The division office is a field office of the DepEd in Cagayan Valley region. The office governs the public and private elementary and public and  private high schools throughout the municipality.

References

External links

 [ Philippine Standard Geographic Code]

Municipalities of Batanes